B-LIVE is a global concert series that showcases international and emerging artists. A program of music events that has toured 25 countries, it is a ticketed event for adults ages 21 and over.

History
B-LIVE has taken place in over 25 countries, including the United Kingdom, Spain, Italy, New Zealand, Brazil and Mexico. It is orchestrated and presented by Bacardi Rum.

B-LIVE 2007
In November 2007, B-LIVE visited Los Angeles whose lineup had an international Latin appeal. Featured artists included "The Queen of Spanish Rock," Alejandra Guzmán from Mexico; three time Latin Grammy award winner Calle 13 from Puerto Rico; Latin rockers Maldita Vecindad from Mexico, and one of Colombia's original rock bands, Aterciopelados. The concert took place at historic Olvera Street in Los Angeles, California.

B-LIVE benefited the city of Los Angeles by donating $25,000 to the National Hispanic Foundation for the Arts.

B-LIVE 2008
During the fall of 2008, Live Tour, a performance of DJs made its way across the United States featuring turntable greats such as: Mix Master Mike, DJ Z-Trip, DJ JS-1, DJ A-Dog, and DJ Troublemaker.

The Live Tour visited the following cities:

Columbia, Missouri; Lawrence, Kansas; Kansas City, Missouri; St. Cloud, Minnesota; Minneapolis, Minnesota; West Lafayette, Indiana; Bloomington, Illinois; Champaign, Illinois; Columbus, Ohio; Cleveland, Ohio; College Park, Maryland; State College, Pennsylvania; Morgantown, West Virginia; Morgantown, West Virginia; Austin, Texas and Dallas, Texas.

B-LIVE 2009
In summer of 2009 there were performances in 24 cities.

The 2009 B-LIVE Press Party Artist Roster included:
 MSTRKRFT
 A-Trak
 Chromeo
 Diplo
 Kid Sister
 Drop the Lime
 DJ Steve Porter
 DJ Jazzy Jeff
 James Murphy of LCD Sound System
 Para One
 Auto Erotique
 Craig Pettigrew
 Sydney Blu

B-LIVE
Some of the artists performing in B-LIVE 2009 events include:

Toronto-based duo, MSTRKRFT; Fool's Gold label head and Kanye West DJ, A-Trak; best known for his early career with Will Smith, DJ Jazzy Jeff; in collaboration with Major Lazer featuring Diplo and Switch; Montreal-born DJ and producer, Tiga; New York based dance music producer and remixer, DJ Steve Porter; LA based producer, Z-Trip; punk/dance duo from Brooklyn, New York, Matt and Kim; hip-hop artist and singer; Q-Tip; and special guest Santigold.

B-LIVE events visited the following US cities in the summer of 2009:

References

2007 concert tours
2008 concert tours
2009 concert tours